No Letting Go may refer to:
"No Letting Go" (song), 2003
No Letting Go (film), 2016

See also
 "Not Letting Go", a 2015 song by English rapper Tinie Tempah